Joe Ostman (born July 12, 1995) is an American football defensive end who is currently a free agent. He played college football for Central Michigan. He signed with the Philadelphia Eagles as an undrafted free agent in 2018.

Professional career 
After going undrafted when coming out of Central Michigan, Ostman signed with the Philadelphia Eagles on May 11, 2018. He was waived on September 1, 2018, and signed to the practice squad the next day.

After spending the entire 2018 season on the Eagles' practice squad, Ostman signed a reserve/future contract with the team on January 14, 2019. He tore his anterior cruciate ligament and was placed on injured reserve on August 6, 2019.

Ostman was waived by the Eagles during final roster cuts on September 5, 2020, and signed to the practice squad the next day. He was elevated to the active roster on November 21, December 26, and January 2, 2021, for the team's weeks 11, 16, and 17 games against the Cleveland Browns, Dallas Cowboys, and Washington Football Team, and reverted to the practice squad after each game. He made his NFL debut against the Browns. He signed a reserve/future contract with the Eagles on January 4, 2021.

On August 23, 2021, Ostman was waived/injured by the Eagles and placed on injured reserve.

On May 23, 2022, Ostman was released.

References

External links 
 Philadelphia Eagles bio

1995 births
Living people
People from St. Ignace, Michigan
Players of American football from Michigan
American football defensive ends
Central Michigan Chippewas football players
Philadelphia Eagles players
Ed Block Courage Award recipients